Kristijan Nikolov (born 5 October 1996) is a Macedonian-Turkish professional basketball player for Konyaspor of the Turkish Basketbol Süper Ligi (BSL).

Early years
Nikolov was born in Skopje, Macedonia, to Macedonian parents. He started playing basketball in Macedonia. In 2010, he moved to Galatasaray Liv Hospital where he signed a youth contract to play in it the club's youngster teams.

Professional career
Nikolov made his debut in Galatasaray's senior team in the 2014–15 season.

On 28 June 2015 he was sent on loan to Yeşilgiresun Belediye.

On 2 December 2016, he signed with İstanbul BB.

On 12 September 2017, Nikolov returned to Yeşilgiresun Belediye.

On 12 January 2018, he signed with Socar Petkim S.K.

On 24 July 2019, he signed with MZT Skopje.

On July 12, 2022, he has signed with Konyaspor of the Turkish Basketbol Süper Ligi (BSL).

Personal
In 2014, Nikolov became a Turkish citizen at the age of 17.

References

External links
 Kristijan Nikolov at eurobasket.com
 Kristijan Nikolov at euroleague.net
 Kristijan Nikolov at fiba.com

1996 births
Living people
Galatasaray S.K. (men's basketball) players
İstanbul Büyükşehir Belediyespor basketball players
Macedonian expatriate basketball people in Turkey
Macedonian men's basketball players
Petkim Spor players
Point guards
Shooting guards
Sportspeople from Skopje
Turkish men's basketball players
Yeşilgiresun Belediye players